The Locust Plague of 1874, or the Grasshopper Plague of 1874, occurred when hordes of Rocky Mountain locusts invaded the Great Plains in the United States and Canada. The swarms were so thick that they could cover the sun for up to six hours and caused millions of dollars worth of crop damage. Efforts were made to stop the infestation, including eating the locusts. Following the plague, the population of Rocky Mountain locusts continued to decline each year after 1874 and in spring 1875, many of the hatched locust eggs died due to frost, contributing to their eventual extinction.

Area 
The locust plague encompassed the Dakota Territory, the Montana Territory, the Wyoming Territory, the Colorado Territory, Iowa, Minnesota, Missouri, Nebraska, the Indian Territory, and Texas. The locust plague also reached the Northwest Territories and Manitoba; one 1877 observer theorized that a range of coniferous timber prevented them from overtaking some parts of Saskatchewan. While the exact mechanism behind why locust movement is inhibited by coniferous ranges, the locusts were never observed to be able to cross these regions.

The United States Entomological Commission wrote in 1880 that the infestation "covered a swath equal to the combined areas of Connecticut, Delaware, Maine, Maryland, Massachusetts, New Hampshire, New Jersey, New York, Pennsylvania, Rhode Island, and Vermont."

Damage 

Compared to previous infestations in the region, the 1874 plague was significantly more damaging. In some cases, the locusts blocked the sun for up to six hours. The locusts were able to breed quickly due to it being hot and dry during the spring and summer. The locusts swarms would pile up to over a foot high and ate crops, trees, leaves, grass, wool off sheep, harnesses on horses, paint from wagons, and pitchfork handles. Drinking water was often all that the farmers could protect. The locusts ate for several days by eating from the fields and trees, and moved to eating food from inside the farmers' homes. Carpets and clothes were torn apart by the locusts in the process. The excrement from the locusts infected the ponds and streams. Despite livestock eating the locusts and bonfires killing many of them, the estimated 120 billion to 12.5 trillion locusts were not stopped by any of these interventions. Crop damage caused by the locusts cost over $200 million. Migration to the Midwest stopped as a result, causing many travelers to return to their homes in the east or move further to the west. Trains had trouble moving due to the "slippery, gooey mess" of dead locusts. The tracks were "slick with grasshopper guts" which caused the trains to lose traction, according to the book It Happened in Nebraska.

A Kansas pioneer was quoted as saying, "They looked like a great, white glistening cloud, for their wings caught the sunshine on them and made them look like a cloud of white vapor". Another Kansas settler said, "I never saw such a sight before. This morning, as we looked up toward the sun, we could see millions in the air. They looked like snowflakes." Farmers tried killing the locusts with fire and exploding gunpowder, and one case resulted in the locusts smothering out the flames. A device called a hopperdozer was used to attempt to stop the infestation. The hopperdozer had a scraper with coal tar that was pulled by horses on fields, but it only worked on flat ground. This device would be dragged against the wind, and young locusts would be blown into the tar, killing them.

Results 
In Kansas, Governor Thomas A. Osborn convinced the legislature to approve $73,000 in bonds for aid and railroads carried supplies for free to Kansas farmers. Other Americans donated barley and corn to the Kansas farmers. In Nebraska, it was required that farmers have no leftover money and nothing left to sell in order to receive assistance from the Nebraska Relief and Aid Association. Entomologist Charles Valentine Riley suggested eating the locusts to get rid of them, including locusts fried in butter and in a soup. Farmers would attempt to make meals out of the locusts. The federal government eased residency requirements for homesteaders and Congress supplied $30,000 in seeds to the area. From 1874 to 1875, the U.S. Army handed out thousands of pieces of clothing and other items, including rations. In spring 1875, many of the hatched locust eggs from the 1874 infestation died due to the frost. The population of Rocky Mountain locusts continued to decline each year after 1874, leading to their extinction. Many farmers left Nebraska due to the crop damage. Riley wrote in the 1877 book The Locust Plague in the United States that the 1874 locust plague was worse than any of its predecessors. He also said that famine and death in the affected regions would have been possible if it was not for the aid received. Riley surmised that Kansas ultimately suffered the most out of the affected regions. Locusts continued to cause more infestations, including Albert's swarm, until insecticides were created during World War II.

Cultural impact 
Laura Ingalls Wilder wrote about the locust devastation of her family’s Minnesota farm in one of her memoir books for children, On the Banks of Plum Creek.

References 

Locust swarms
Melanoplinae
1874 in the United States
1874 in Canada
1874 disasters in Canada
Natural disasters in the United States
Natural disasters in Canada
Laura Ingalls Wilder
1874 natural disasters in the United States